cFosSpeed is a traffic shaping software often bundled with MSI motherboards for the
Windows operating system. The program attaches itself as a device driver to the Windows
network stack where it performs packet inspection
and layer-7 protocol analysis. It has been noted as causing some issues with network connections, and is difficult to uninstall.

A version of the software is bundled with some Gigabyte motherboards under the name "Gigabyte Speed" and some ASRock motherboards as "XFast LAN".

Operational summary 
The software divides data packets into different traffic classes through filtering rules. It has been noted to cause problems with some users' internet connections.
Data traffic can be classified and prioritized by program name, by layer-7 protocol, by
TCP or UDP port
numbers, by DSCP tags as well as many other criteria.

Outgoing traffic is queued and sent out in order of priority. The program uses TCP flow control to send new data only after older data has been received. Data may also be throttled by lowering the TCP window size. The software contains a packet filter firewall. Users are also able to write their own traffic classifications.

In recent years some driver issues have been found with cFosSpeed but they are easily fixable.

Similar Products
NetLimiter
TrafficShaperXP

References

External links
 Official site
 Review on Softonic onsoftware
 Dragon Center - MSI uninstall software

Network performance
Internet Protocol based network software
Windows-only shareware